Raven Saunders (born May 15, 1996) is an American track and field athlete who competes in the shot put and discus throw. She won three NCAA collegiate titles in the shot put for the University of Mississippi. She was a world junior medalist in 2014 and the Pan American junior champion in 2015.

She has also worked as an advocate for racial justice and mental health.

On March 15, 2023, Saunders accepted an 18-month suspension from USADA, for a whereabouts violation (missing three doping tests in a year), retroactive to August 15, 2022. All performances since August 15, 2022 have been disqualified.

Career

Prep
Saunders attended Burke High School in Charleston, South Carolina and competed in track and field while there. She was nominated as the Gatorade Female Track and Field Athlete of the Year for her efforts.

NCAA
Saunders went on to attend Southern Illinois University in Carbondale, Illinois before transferring to the University of Mississippi and competing for the Ole Miss Rebels track team.

She was highly successful as a Southern Illinois Salukis, winning the shot put titles at the 2015 Missouri Valley Conference Indoor Track and Field Championships, 2015 NCAA Indoor Championships, 2015 Missouri Valley Conference Outdoor Track and Field Championships, and the 2015 NCAA Outdoor Championships.

She is the first American junior athlete to throw beyond eighteen metres. She continued to improve her American junior records and broke the Missouri Valley Conference record.

She was highly successful as an Ole Miss Rebels, winning the shot put titles at the 2016 Southeastern Conference Indoor Track and Field Championships, placing 12th at 2016 NCAA Indoor Championships, winning shot put titles at 2016 Southeastern Conference Outdoor Track and Field Championships, and 2016 NCAA Outdoor Championships.

World competition
Raven placed first at the 2014 US Junior Championships. Saunders made her international debut at the 2014 World Junior Championships in Athletics in Eugene, Oregon and took the silver medal behind Guo Tianqian of China (who was Asian champion one year later). Saunders raised funds through the internet in order to attend the meeting, which was nearly 3000 miles away from her hometown in South Carolina.

2021 Olympics 
In 2021 Saunders placed second at the U.S. Track and Field Olympic Trials with a shot put throw of 19.96 m (65 ft 6 in). She was the silver medalist in the 2020 Tokyo Olympics, throwing a distance of 19.79 m (64 ft 11 in).

After receiving her silver medal during the medal ceremony, Saunders raised her arms and crossed them in the shape of an X on the podium which she stated symbolized her support for oppressed people. As a result, the IOC launched a probe to find if the gesture violated the rules of prohibiting any kind of demonstration or political, religious and racial propaganda in an Olympic site. The United States Olympic Committee defended Saunders' gesture stating that it did not breach its rules as it was a "peaceful expression in support of racial and social justice (that) was respectful of her competitors". On 4 August 2021, the IOC suspended its investigation on Saunders' gesture following the news of the death of her mother.

Personal life
Saunders is openly lesbian. She has been outspoken about struggles with depression and has worked as an advocate for racial justice and mental health.

International competitions

National titles
 NCAA Women's Division I Outdoor Track and Field Championships
 Shot put: 2015, 2016
 NCAA Women's Division I Indoor Track and Field Championships
 Shot put: 2015

References

External links
 
 

Living people
1996 births
Sportspeople from Charleston, South Carolina
Track and field athletes from South Carolina
American female shot putters
American female discus throwers
African-American female track and field athletes
Ole Miss Rebels women's track and field athletes
Southern Illinois Salukis women's track and field athletes
Athletes (track and field) at the 2016 Summer Olympics
USA Outdoor Track and Field Championships winners
Athletes (track and field) at the 2020 Summer Olympics
Medalists at the 2020 Summer Olympics
Olympic silver medalists for the United States in track and field
American LGBT sportspeople
LGBT African Americans
LGBT track and field athletes
Lesbian sportswomen
LGBT people from South Carolina
21st-century African-American sportspeople
21st-century African-American women